Platyptilia grisea is a moth of the family Pterophoridae. It is known from Madagascar.

This species has a wingspan of 18mm.

References

grisea
Endemic fauna of Madagascar
Moths of Madagascar
Moths described in 1994